The China Open is an annual men's and women's professional tennis tournament held in Beijing, China. The women's event is a WTA 1000 event on the WTA Tour, while the men's is an ATP Tour 500 event on the ATP Tour. The tournament was first held in its current iteration in 2004 as a back-to-back event for 4 years, though followed on from a Beijing event in 1993 to 1997. In 2008, it became a combined event for the first time.

In 2006, the China Open became the first tournament outside the United States to use the Hawk-Eye system in match play.

Novak Djokovic is the only player to have won the title six times and holds the distinction of having never lost a match at the China Open. Djokovic holds the record for consecutive wins with four titles.  In doubles, the Bryan Brothers are the only doubles pair to have won consecutive titles.

Svetlana Kuznetsova, Serena Williams, Agnieszka Radwańska and Caroline Wozniacki hold the record for most titles won in the women's tournament, with two titles each.

Past finals

Women's singles

Men's singles

Women's doubles

Men's doubles

Notes

See also
Tennis in China

References

External links
 Official website

 
Tennis tournaments in China
Hard court tennis tournaments
WTA Tour
Sport in Beijing
Recurring sporting events established in 1993
ATP Tour 500